Emmett Riley (born May 6, 1969) is an American politician who has served in the Connecticut House of Representatives from the 46th district since 2013.

References

1969 births
Living people
Democratic Party members of the Connecticut House of Representatives
21st-century American politicians